The Western Cape Department of Transport and Public Works is a department of the Government of the Western Cape. It is responsible for the development of the transport system in the Western Cape province of South Africa, and for constructing and maintaining buildings and other structures for the other departments of the provincial government.

The political leader of the department is the Provincial Minister of Transport and Public Works, this is Bonginkosi Madikizela of the Democratic Alliance. The administrative head is the Superintendent-General of Transport and Public Works, this is Jacqui Gooch.

In the 2017/18 financial year, the department had 2,309 employees and a budget of R7,426,579,000.

See also
 Government of the Western Cape
 Department of Transport (South Africa)
 Department of Public Works (South Africa)

References

External links
 

Transport and Public Works
Western Cape
Western Cape
Ministries established in 1994
Transport in the Western Cape
Transport organisations based in South Africa